The Newburgh–Beacon Ferry is a ferry service crossing the Hudson River that connects Newburgh with Beacon, New York.

It carries passengers between the two cities during rush hour, primarily transporting commuters from the west side of the river at Newburgh to the commuter train station on the east side at Beacon where they can catch Metro North Hudson Line service to Grand Central Terminal and other points in New York City.

NY Waterway operates the ferry under contract from the Metropolitan Transportation Authority, along with the Haverstraw–Ossining Ferry downstream. Service began in 2005 after the Newburgh–Beacon Bridge had, 42 years earlier, rendered over two centuries of ferry service obsolete.

The Beacon terminal is at a dock immediately adjacent to the station; the Newburgh terminal is at the south end of Front Street. The fare is $1.75 per person; the trip across the river takes approximately 10 minutes.

History
Tradition has it that Native Americans regularly crossed the Hudson River at the point between what is now Beacon and Newburgh, long before Europeans arrived in America. In 1743, a formal ferry was established when Alexander Colden received a royal charter from King George II to carry passengers and goods for profit. The right to operate ferries between Beacon and Newburgh was bestowed upon the Ramsdell family by the heirs of Alexander Colden. They ran the ferry through the Steamboat Era until 1956, when NYSBA took over ferry services.

Before the bridge
By the early 20th century the fleet had grown to three 160-foot (49 m) coal-fired ferries, the Orange, Dutchess and Beacon, capable of carrying 30 vehicles each. It linked the two segments of NY 52, the major east-west artery at that point.

In the winter, ice was sometimes a problem. In the 1950s, one of the ferries got stuck in the ice. In fact, the NYSBA opened the Kingston bridge ahead of schedule because river ice was keeping the ferry in dock and people couldn't get to work. Similarly, people stalled on the Newburgh-Beacon ferry, en route to work at Nabisco, Texaco or the state prisons, had difficulty getting to work whenever ice trapped their boat and they had to wait for another one to clear a path to shore. If the ice was thick enough and solid enough, they simply walked — by the hundreds — back and forth.

The bridge and the end of an era
The impetus for a bridge began with the opening in 1916 of Bear Mountain State Park. To improve access to the popular attraction, in 1924, the Bear Mountain Bridge opened--the first vehicular/pedestrian (non-railroad) bridge over the Hudson between New York City and Albany--and the ferry at Bear Mountain was discontinued.

The ferries were seen as past their day, due to their mounting financial and operational problems, even before the construction of the Newburgh-Beacon bridge. Increasing traffic on 52 by mid-century, coupled with the building of the New York State Thruway in the Hudson corridor, was straining the ferry beyond its breaking point. The state's Department of Public Works began planning for a bridge, but it was not a serious possibility until federal money became available through the construction of Interstate 84.

The last Hudson crossing to be built on the river's estuarine section below Albany was completed and opened to traffic on November 2, 1963. By that time the New York State Bridge Authority had already had to take them over. The very next day, 220 years of ferry service passed into the region's rich history when the Orange and Dutchess saluted each other midriver on their 5 p.m. runs.

The Orange and the Dutchess sailed from Newburgh for the last time on Nov. 3, 1963, packed with people and cars. The bells on board and on shore tolled as the boats crossed the river in the early evening chill against the imposing silhouette of the Newburgh-Beacon Bridge, which had opened the day before. Ten minutes later, when the ferries docked in Beacon and disgorged their cargo, people got in their cars or hopped on the waiting buses and went home, over the new bridge. The ferries, built in the early 1900s at the Newburgh shipyards, were sold and, in time, scrapped.

The Dutchess and Beacon, both in very decrepit condition, were sold as scrap. The Orange, in slightly better shape, was purchased and refurbished  by Myles Rosenthal with the intent of turning it into a floating restaurant. It also was to carry visitors from Manhattan to the 1964 New York World's Fair. After only a few charter trips the boat fell victim to vandals, which led to it joining its sister vessels in oblivion later that year.

In the next decade, when the new bridge quickly became stretched to capacity, no one suggested bringing the ferry back. Instead the bridge was widened and a second span built.

The end of ferry service dealt the death blow to Newburgh's once-vibrant waterfront, and in the early 1970s urban renewal led to much of the land being cleared in preparation for new construction projects that never came to fruition.

Revival

Increasing regional growth in the 1990s led to frequent traffic jams on the bridge and swamped parking lots at the train station. Interest grew in reviving ferry service, especially after MTA's successful 2000 restoration of the Haverstraw–Ossining Ferry across a similarly-wide portion of the river further south. However, plans never quite seemed to materialize despite considerable appropriations of money, and in the interim commuters had to be content with a shuttle bus across the bridge from the park and ride lot on NY 17K near its connection to the New York State Thruway. Meanwhile, MTA began for the first time to require parking permits at Beacon, and the waiting list swelled to at least 600 more than capacity, even after the lots were enlarged in the early 2000s.

Eventually, it was able, with the help of the region's congressional delegation, to secure a $1.1 million grant from the Federal Transit Administration to close the gap between fares and costs, along with other subsidies. Governor George Pataki announced on October 7, 2005, that ferry service would resume in 10 days. To encourage use of the new ferry, no fares were charged for the remainder of that month.

The future

For now, the ferry is just another intermodal option for commuters, but local officials, particularly in Newburgh, see much potential for their cities in the long term. For Beacon, the rebirth of the ferry primarily serves to reduce pressure on a crowded parking lot, freeing-up more spaces for residents and making the city a more attractive place for commuters to live, but Newburgh has grander designs tied into the redevelopment of its waterfront.

When service began, some riders expressed their hopes that service would eventually extend into weekends, allowing them to use it for trips to entertainment in the city. Newburgh officials hope, however, that dining options on their waterfront will help make it as much of a destination for ferry riders as an originating point. A possible scenario has visitors from the city taking in Dia:Beacon in the afternoon, then taking the ferry to Newburgh for dinner then back to Beacon for the train trip home. Ultimately it could stimulate growing local arts communities on both sides of the river

The boat

MTA moved the West New York, a boat which had been used to evacuate Lower Manhattan after the September 11, 2001 attacks, to Newburgh Bay to inaugurate its new service. It carries 149 passengers.

One major problem MTA and NY Waterway had to overcome in planning was the ice floes that can sometimes clog the shallows near the riverbanks, particularly on the Newburgh side, in cold weather. This situation is not encountered by its ferries downriver as the salinity of the river below the Hudson Highlands is high enough to prevent ice from forming in all but the coldest temperatures. However, while Newburgh Bay is below the river's salt front, ice from the freshwater sections often accumulates in it.

The West New York was ultimately fitted with a strengthened hull and a closed cooling system to protect it. The vessel was also repainted with the "FerryRailLink" logo. The winter following the ferry's reintroduction was rather mild and the first ice-free winter on the Hudson in a long time, as was the first half of the following winter. On February 6, 2007, however, a cold snap had left enough ice at each bank that the MTA decided to do as it had done with the downriver ferry the day before and suspend service until conditions improved, renting buses to take commuters across the bridge in the meantime. Service was finally restored at the end of the month when a warming trend melted enough ice.

, the Captain Mark Summers has replaced the West New York on the route.

Fares and schedule

A one-way ferry trip currently costs $1.75 per person. It can be paid at Newburgh and during the AM Rush only at Beacon or on board. The MTA, as is its practice, not only sells train tickets at the ferry terminals but encourages riders to buy them there. For regular riders, a UniTicket package combining train and ferry fare for a month is available for $321. UniTicket purchasers are also covered by MTA's Guaranteed Ride Home program, whereby if the ferry is unable to operate they will be able to get a taxi to take them home or to their cars.

Currently, on weekdays, there are six ferry crossings in the morning and eight in the afternoon.

References

Further reading
Newburgh-Beacon ferry service begins, in the Poughkeepsie Journal.
https://law.justia.com/cases/federal/district-courts/FSupp/337/1161/1469796/

External links
MTA ferry page, with fare and schedule information
video of the Newburgh - Beacon Ferry taken in the 1920s 

Ferries of New York (state)
Crossings of the Hudson River
Transportation in Orange County, New York
Transportation in Dutchess County, New York
Newburgh, New York
Beacon, New York